The Wyrrabalong National Park is a coastal national park that is located on the Central Coast of New South Wales, in eastern Australia. The park is also noted for containing the last significant coastal (littoral) rainforest on the Central Coast.

Most of the park lies in the Tuggerah Important Bird Area, identified as such by BirdLife International because of its importance for a variety of water and woodland birds.

The average elevation of the terrain is 8 meters.

History
The land now occupied by Wyrrabalong National Park was first inhabited by the indigenous Darkinjung and Awabakal peoples. The Darkinjung occupied the southern section and The Awabakal occupied the northern section. It is believed Europeans first discovered the Tuggerah Lakes in 1796. It was found by Governor of Tasmania, Colonel David Collins, who had arrived on the First Fleet, during the search for an escaped convict, Mary Morgan, who was said to be living with the Aborigines to the North of the Hawkesbury River.

Weather 
The average summer temperature is between 20 °C and 25 °C, and the record measured temperature is 42.4 °C, in winter the temperature is between 10 °C and 17 °C, and the lowest measured temperature is 3.4 °C.

See also

 Protected areas of New South Wales

References

External links
 

National parks of New South Wales
Central Coast (New South Wales)
Protected areas established in 1991
1991 establishments in Australia
Important Bird Areas of New South Wales